Singapore began their participation in the Paralympic Games when a squad was sent to the 1988 Summer Paralympics held in Seoul, South Korea. Despite winning no medals in the 1988 Summer Games, Singapore continued to send teams to the Summer Paralympics. At the 2008 Summer Paralympics, Singapore sent six athletes and came home with four medals. The 2008 Games was the first time Singapore has won a medal in any Paralympic competition.

Medal tables

Summer Paralympics

Medals by Summer Games

Medals by Summer Sports

List of medalists

References